International Solid-State Circuits Conference is a global forum for presentation of advances in solid-state circuits and Systems-on-a-Chip. The conference is held every year in February at the San Francisco Marriott Marquis in downtown San Francisco. ISSCC is sponsored by IEEE Solid-State Circuits Society.

According to The Register, "The ISSCC event is the second event of each new year, following the Consumer Electronics Show, where new PC processors and sundry other computing gadgets are brought to market."

History of ISSCC 
Early participants in the inaugural conference in 1954 belonged to the Institute of Radio Engineers (IRE) Circuit Theory Group and the IRE subcommittee of Transistor Circuits.  The conference was held in Philadelphia and local chapters of IRE and American Institute of Electrical Engineers (AIEE) were in attendance.  Later on AIEE and IRE would merge to become the present-day IEEE.

The first conference consisted of papers from six organizations: Bell Telephone Laboratories, General Electric, RCA, Philco, Massachusetts Institute of Technology and the University of Pennsylvania.  The registration was $4 (early registration was $3) and 601 people registered.  International attendees arrived from Canada, England and Japan.  With subsequent conferences came many more international participants with the first international presentation in 1958.  By 1965, the number of overseas program committee members increased to 8 and in 1970 the overseas members began meeting separately in both Europe and Japan.  Selected members of these regional program committees would attend the final program meeting in America.

The name of the 1954 Conference appears in various publications and documents as:  "The Transistor Conference", "The Conference on Transistor Circuits", "The Philadelphia Conference", or "The National Conference on Transistor Circuits".  The current name "International Solid-State Circuits Conference" was settled by the organizers in 1960.

While ISSCC was founded in Philadelphia, in the mid-1960s the center of semiconductor development in the United States was shifting west.  In 1978, the conference was held on alternate coasts with New York soon substituting for Philadelphia.  In 1990, San Francisco became the Conference's permanent home.

In 2013, ISSCC celebrated its 60th anniversary and will had several special programs to celebrate 60 years of circuit and SoC innovation.

Technical Program Committee 
The Technical Program Committee (TPC) in early years was extremely fluid in order to deal with the constantly changing topics in the industry.  By 1968 the list of subcommittees had settled to Digital, Analog (Linear), Microwave and Other, where the subcommittee members in Other would address the one-of-a-kind papers.  In the 80's, the Microwave Subcommittee was dropped from the program as the overlap between the topics and attendees was diminishing.  In addition, Digital split into Digital, Memory and Signal Processing subcommittees.  In 1992, Emerging Technologies was launched and chartered to seek out the one-of-a-kind applications which may find a home in ISSCC.  Today there are 10 subcommittees: Analog, Data Converters, Energy Efficient Digital (EED), High-Performance Digital (HPD), Imagers, MEMs, Medical and Displays (IMMD), Memory, RF, Technology Directions (formerly Emerging Technologies), Wireless and Wireline.

TPC chairs

European Committee Chairs

Far East Committee Chairs

Executive committee 
ISSCC is a strictly non-profit organization run by the Executive Committee.  From formative years through 1980 the Conference chair was usually filled by the previous year's Program Chair. To provide needed continuity, the term of Conference Chair was extended to at least 5 years.

Conference Chairs

See also 
Custom Integrated Circuits Conference
Hot Chips
International Electron Devices Meeting
Symposia on VLSI Technology and Circuits

References 

W. David Pricer, "ISSCC: Sixty Years of Innovative Evolution", 2013 Commemorative Supplement to the Digest of Technical Papers, ISSCC 2013 (to be published)

External links
 

IEEE conferences
Computer science conferences